Clea nigricans is a species of freshwater snail with an operculum, an aquatic gastropod mollusk in the family Buccinidae, the true whelks, most of which are marine.

Clea nigricans is the type species of the genus Clea.

Distribution 
This Southeast Asian species occurs in the Malay Peninsula. It is found in member states Sabah and Sarawak on Borneo. It was recorded also from Sirhassen island in South Natuna Islands, Indonesia.

Description

The width of the shell is 5–12 mm. The height of the shell is 10–22 mm.

Ecology
It lives in calm pools of fast-flowing streams and also on rocks in small waterfalls. Polgar et al. (2015) measured thermal tolerance of Clea nigricans. The behaviour of Clea nigricans in natural habitat is unknown.

Feeding habits 
Like all snails in the clade Neogastropoda, this species is carnivorous. It feeds on different types of worms and gastropods, often eating other, larger snails after burying themselves and ambushing their prey.

Life cycle 
Clea nigricans consists of defined male and female genders, and is not capable of gender change. It is unknown as to how to sex these animals. Both males and females seem to be the same size and shape. When a male and female mate, they lock together for 8–12 hours.

References

External links

Buccinidae
Gastropods described in 1855